The men's épée was a fencing event held as part of the Fencing at the 1904 Summer Olympics programme. It was the second time the event was held at the Olympics. 5 fencers from 3 nations competed. The competition was held on September 7, 1904. The event was won by Ramón Fonst of Cuba, repeating as Olympic champion in the individual épée. The silver medal went to Charles Tatham and the bronze to Albertson Van Zo Post, both of United States.

Background

This was the second appearance of the event, which was not held at the first Games in 1896 (with only foil and sabre events held) but has been held at every Summer Olympics since 1900.

Ramón Fonst of Cuba, the gold medalist in 1900, returned. Albertson Van Zo Post had been the United States champion in 1896. Charles Tatham was the United States champion in 1901, 1902, and 1903. The 1904 American champion, Charles Bothner, did not compete.

Germany made its debut in the event. Cuba and the United States each appeared for the second time, the only two nations to have competed at both épée appearances to date.

Competition format

The competition, with only 5 fencers, consisted of a single round-robin final pool. Under the rules of the Amateur Fencing League of America, which are thought to have been used, bouts were to three touches. A point was scored for each touch, with a 0.25 point deduction for double-touches. Points were used to determine placement.

Schedule

Results

Specifics on the épée competition are unknown, though the final rankings of the 5 fencers are known.

Notes

Sources

 

Fencing at the 1904 Summer Olympics